Knights of Labor (K of L), officially Noble and Holy Order of the Knights of Labor, was an American labor federation active in the late 19th century, especially the 1880s. It operated in the United States as well in Canada, and had chapters also in Great Britain and Australia. Its most important leader was Terence V. Powderly. The Knights promoted the social and cultural uplift of the worker, and demanded the eight-hour day. In some cases it acted as a labor union, negotiating with employers, but it was never well organized or funded. It was notable in its ambition to organize across lines of gender and race and in the inclusion of both skilled and unskilled labor. After a rapid expansion in the mid-1880s, it suddenly lost its new members and became a small operation again. The Knights of Labor had served, however, as the first mass organization of the white working class of the United States.

It was founded by Uriah Stephens on December 28, 1869, reached 28,000 members in 1880, then jumped to 100,000 in 1884. By 1886, 20% of all workers were affiliated, nearly 800,000 members. Its frail organizational structure could not cope as it was battered by charges of failure and violence and calumnies of the association with the Haymarket Square riot. Most members abandoned the movement in 1886–1887, leaving at most 100,000 in 1890. Many opted to join groups that helped to identify their specific needs, instead of the KOL which addressed many different types of issues. The Panic of 1893 terminated the Knights of Labor's importance. Remnants of the Knights of Labor continued in existence until 1949, when the group's last 50-member local dropped its affiliation.

Origins

In 1869, Uriah Smith Stephens, James L. Wright, and a small group of Philadelphia tailors founded a secret organization known as the Noble Order of the Knights of Labor. The collapse of the National Labor Union in 1873 left a vacuum for workers looking for organization. The Knights became better organized with a national vision when, in 1879, they replaced Stephens with Terence V. Powderly, who was just 30 years old at the time. The body became popular with Pennsylvania coal miners during the economic depression of the mid-1870s, then it grew rapidly. The KOL was a diverse industrial union open to all workers. The leaders felt that it was best to have a versatile population in order to get points of view from all aspects. The Knights of Labor barred five groups from membership: bankers, land speculators, lawyers, liquor dealers and gamblers. Its members included low skilled workers, railroad workers, immigrants, and steel workers.

As membership expanded, the Knights began to function more as a labor union and less of a secret organization. During the 1880s, the Knights of Labor played a huge role in independent and third-party movements. Local assemblies began not only to emphasize cooperative enterprises, but to initiate strikes to win concessions from employers. The Knights of Labor brought together workers of different religions, races and genders and helped them all create a bond and unify all for the same cause. The new leader Powderly opposed strikes as a "relic of barbarism", but the size and the diversity of the Knights afforded local assemblies a great deal of autonomy.

In 1882, the Knights ended their membership rituals and removed the words "Noble Order" from their name. This was intended to mollify the concerns of Catholic members and the bishops who wanted to avoid any resemblance to freemasonry.
Though initially averse to strikes to advance their goals, the Knights did aid various strikes and boycotts. The Wabash Railroad strike in 1885 saw Powderly finally adapt and support an eventually successful strike against Jay Gould's Wabash Line. Gould met with Powderly and agreed to call off his campaign against the Knights of Labor, which had caused the turmoil originally. This gave momentum to the Knights and membership surged. By 1886, the Knights had more than 700,000 members.

The Knights' primary demand was for the eight-hour workday. They also called for legislation to end child and convict labor as well as a graduated income tax. They also supported cooperatives. The only woman to hold office in the Knights of Labor, Leonora Barry, worked as an investigator. She described the horrific conditions in factories employing women and children. These reports made Barry the first person to collect national statistics on the American working woman.

Powderly and the Knights tried to avoid divisive political issues, but in the early 1880s, many Knights had become followers of Henry George's ideology known now as Georgism. In 1883, Powderly officially recommended George's book and announced his support of "single tax" on land values. During the New York mayoral election of 1886, Powderly was able to successfully push the organization towards the favor of Henry George. In 1886, the Knights became of the part of the short lived United Labor Party, an alliance of labor organizations formed in support of George's campaign in the 1886 New York City mayoral election.

The Knights of Labor helped to bring together many different types of people from all different walks of life; for example Catholic and Protestant Irish-born workers. The KOL appealed to them because they worked very closely with the Irish Land League. The Knights had a mixed record on inclusiveness and exclusiveness. They accepted women and blacks (after 1878) and their employers as members, and advocating the admission of blacks into local assemblies. However, the organization tolerated the segregation of assemblies in the South. Bankers, doctors, lawyers, stockholders, and liquor manufacturers were excluded because they were considered unproductive members of society. Asians were also excluded, and in November 1885, a branch of the Knights in Tacoma, Washington violently expelled the city's Chinese workers, who amounted to nearly a tenth of the overall city population at the time. The Union Pacific Railroad came into conflict with the Knights. When the Knights in Wyoming refused to work more hours in 1885, the railroad hired Chinese workers as strikebreakers and to stir up racial animosity. The result was the Rock Springs massacre, that killed scores of Chinese workers, and drove the rest out of Wyoming. About 50 African-American sugar-cane laborers organized by the Knights went on strike and were murdered by strikebreakers in the 1887 Thibodaux massacre in Louisiana. The Knights strongly supported passage of the Chinese Exclusion Act of 1882 and the Contract Labor Law of 1885, as did many other labor groups, demonstrating the limits of their commitment to solidarity. While they claimed to not be "against immigration", their anti-Asian racism demonstrated the limits and inconsistency of their anti-racist platform.

Decline

Southwest railroad strike of 1886

The Great Southwest railroad strike of 1886 was a Knights strike involving more than 200,000 workers. Beginning on March 1, 1886, railroad workers in five states struck against the Union Pacific and Missouri Pacific railroads, owned by Jay Gould. At least ten people were killed. The unravelling of the strike within two months led directly to the collapse of the Knights of Labor and the formation of the American Federation of Labor.

Catholic Church
The Knights of Labor attracted many Catholics, who were a large part of the membership, perhaps a majority. Powderly was also a Catholic. However, the Knights's use of secrecy, similar to the Masons, during its early years concerned many bishops of the Church. The Knights used secrecy and deception to help prevent employers from firing members.

After the Archbishop of Quebec condemned the Knights in 1884, twelve American archbishops voted 10 to 2 against doing likewise in the United States. Furthermore, Cardinal James Gibbons and Bishop John Ireland defended the Knights. Gibbons went to the Vatican to talk to the hierarchy.

In 1886, right after the peak of the Knights of Labor, they started to lose more members to the American Federation of Labor. It has been believed that the fall of the Knights of Labor was due to their lack of adaptability and beliefs in the old-style industrial capitalism.

Legacy

Though often overlooked, the Knights of Labor contributed to the tradition of labor protest songs in America. The Knights frequently included music in their regular meetings, and encouraged local members to write and perform their work. In Chicago, James and Emily Talmadge, printers and supporters of the Knights of Labor, published the songbook "Labor Songs Dedicated to the Knights of Labor" (1885). The song "Hold the Fort" [also "Storm the Fort"], a Knights of Labor pro-labor revision of the hymn by the same name, became the most popular labor song prior to Ralph Chaplin's IWW (Industrial Workers of the World) anthem "Solidarity Forever". Pete Seeger often performed this song and it appears on a number of his recordings. Songwriter and labor singer Bucky Halker includes the Talmadge version, entitled "Our Battle Song," on his CD Don't Want Your Millions (Revolting Records 2000). Halker also draws heavily on the Knights songs and poems in his book on labor song and poetry, For Democracy, Workers and God: Labor Song-Poems and Labor Protest, 1865-1895 (University of Illinois Press, 1991).

Racism and wages
The Knights of Labor supported the Chinese Exclusion Act, claiming that industrialists were using Chinese workers as a wedge to keep wages low.

Anti-Chinese rhetoric and violence were more prevalent among the western chapters of the Knights. In 1880, San Francisco Knights wrote, "They bear the semblance of men, but live like beasts...who eat rice and the offal of the slaughter house. The article also calls Chinese "natural thieves" and states that all Chinese women are prostitutes. In March 1882, Knights joined the San Francisco rally to demand expulsion of the Chinese. Several years later, mobs led by the Knights of Labor, a loosely structured labor federation, rounded up Seattle's Chinese-born workers and campaigned prevent further immigration.

Catharine Collomp notes that "Chinese exclusion was the only issue about which the Knights of Labor and the American Federation of Labor constantly lobbied the Federal government."

Leadership

Grand Master Workmen
1870: Uriah Smith Stephens
1872: Robert Calvin Macauley
1878: Uriah Smith Stephens
1879: Terence V. Powderly
1893: James Sovereign
1897: Henry A. Hicks
1898: John N. Parsons
1900: Isaac D. Chamberlain
1900: Simon Burns
1901: Henry A. Hicks
1902: John Hayes

Grand Worthy Foremen
1878: Ralph Beaumont
1879: Terence V. Powderly
1879: Richard Griffiths
1882: Ralph Beaumont
1883: Henry A. Coffeen
1884: Richard Griffiths
1888: Morris L. Wheat
1890: Hugh Cavanaugh
1893: Michael J. Bishop
1896: Thomas McGuire
1897: Isaac D. Chamberlain
1901: Arthur McConnell
1902: Isaac A. Sanderson
1910s: William A. Denison

See also

 Labor unions in the United States
 Labor federation competition in the United States
 IWW
 Olivier-David Benoît
 Mary Harris Jones
 Mary Stirling, first woman delegate to annual convention

References

Further reading

Scholarly studies
 
 Blum, Edward J. " 'By the Sweat of Your Brow': The Knights of Labor, the Book of Genesis, and the Christian Spirit of the Gilded Age." Labor: Studies in Working-Class History of the Americas 11.2 (2014): 29–34.
 Browne, Henry J. The Catholic Church and the Knights of Labor. Washington: Catholic University of America Press, 1949.
 Case, Theresa A. The Great Southwest Railroad Strike and Free Labor (Texas A&M University Press, 2010); online review, on 1886
 
 Commons, John R. et al., History of Labour in the United States: Volume 2, 1860-1896. (4 vol 1918). vol 2
 Conell, Carol, and Kim Voss. "Formal Organization and the Fate of Social Movements: Craft Association and Class Alliance in the Knights of Labor," American Sociological Review Vol. 55, No. 2 (Apr., 1990), pp. 255–269 in JSTOR, focus on steel industry
 de Leon, Cedric. "Black from white: How the rights of white and black workers became 'labor' and 'civil' rights after the US civil war." Labor Studies Journal 42.1 (2017): 10–26. online
 Fink, Leon. "The New Labor History and the Powers of Historical Pessimism: Consensus, Hegemony, and the Case of the Knights of Labor," Journal of American History Vol. 75, No. 1 (Jun., 1988), pp. 115–136 in JSTOR, historiography
 Fink, Leon. Workingmen's Democracy: The Knights of Labor and American Politics. Urbana: University of Illinois Press, 1983. online
 Grob, Gerald N. "The Knights of Labor and the Trade Unions, 1878-1886," Journal of Economic History Vol. 18, No. 2 (Jun., 1958), pp. 176–192 in JSTOR
 Hild, Matthew. Greenbackers, Knights of Labor, and Populists: Farmer-Labor Insurgency in the Late-Nineteenth-Century South (U of Georgia Press, 2010).
 Hild, Matthew. "Building the Alabama Labor Movement: Nicholas Byrne Stack and the Knights of Labor." Alabama Review 73.2 (2020): 91–117. 
 Hild, Matthew. "The Knights of Labor and the Third-Party Movement in Texas, 1886–1896." Southwestern Historical Quarterly 119.1 (2015): 24–43. online
 Hoffman, Richard C. "Producer co-operatives of the Knights of Labor: seeking worker independence." Labor History (2022): 1–19.
 
 Kaufman, Jason. "Rise and Fall of a Nation of Joiners: The Knights of Labor Revisited," Journal of Interdisciplinary History Vol. 31, No. 4 (Spring, 2001), pp. 553–579 in JSTOR statistical study of competition with other unions and with fraternal societies for members
 
 Keohane, Jennifer. " 'Labor is Noble and Holy': Ironic Inclusion and Exclusion in the Knights of Labor, 1885-1890." Rhetoric Review 38.3 (2019): 311–324. online
 Levine, Susan. "Labor's True Woman: Domesticity and Equal Rights in the Knights of Labor," Journal of American History Vol. 70, No. 2 (Sep., 1983), pp. 323–339 in JSTOR
 Levine, Susan. True Women: Carpet Weavers, Industrialization, and Labor Reform in the Gilded Age. Philadelphia: Temple University Press, 1984.
 
 
 McLaurin, Melton Alonza. The Knights of Labor in the South. Westport, CT: Greenwood Press, 1978.
 Phelan, Craig. Grand Master Workman: Terence Powderly and the Knights of Labor (Greenwood, 2000), scholarly biography online edition
 Taussig, Frank W. "The South-Western Strike of 1886." The Quarterly Journal of Economics 1.2 (1887): 184–222; detailed coverage by a leading scholar; online
 Voss, Kim. The Making of American Exceptionalism: The Knights of Labor and Class Formation in the Nineteenth Century. Ithaca, NY: Cornell University Press, 1994. Sociological study. online
  Ware, Norman J. The Labor Movement in the United States, 1860 - 1895: A Study In Democracy. (1929).
 Weir, Robert E. Beyond Labor's Veil: The Culture of the Knights of Labor. (Pennsylvania State University Press, 1996) online edition
 Weir, Robert E. (1997). A fragile alliance: Henry George and the Knights of Labor. The American Journal of Economics and Sociology, 56, 421–439.
 Weir, Robert E. Knights Unhorsed: Internal Conflict in Gilded Age Social Movement (Wayne State University Press, 2000)

 Wright, Carroll D. "An Historical Sketch of the Knights of Labor," Quarterly Journal of Economics, vol. 1, no. 2 (January 1887), pp. 137–168. in JSTOR

Outside U.S.
 Arvidsson, Stefan The style and mythology of socialism: socialist idealism, 1871-1914. Abingdon, Oxon: Routledge, 2017.
 Kealey, Gregory, and Brian Palmer, Dreaming of What Might Be: The Knights of Labor in Ontario, 1880-1900. New York: Cambridge University Press, 1982.
 Parfitt, Steven. Knights Across the Atlantic: The Knights of Labor in Britain and Ireland (2017) contents also see  online review
 Parfitt, Steven. "A nexus between labour movement and labour movement: the Knights of Labor and the financial side of global labour history." Labor History 58.3 (2017): 288–302.
 Parfitt, Steven. "Transnational Borrowings: Scottish Sons of Labour and American Knights of Labor, 1887–1890." Labour History Review 85.2 (2020): 127–157.
 Parfitt, Steven. "The First-and-a-half International: The Knights of Labor and the History of International Labour Organization in the Nineteenth Century." Labour History Review 80.2 (2015): 135–167.
 Parfitt, Steven. "Completing the Order’s History Down Under: The Knights of Labor in Australia." Labour History: A Journal of Labour and Social History 110 (2016): 1–18.
 Parfitt, Steven. "Constructing the Global History of the Knights of Labor." Labor 14.1 (2017): 13–37.
 , shows that American workers in the window glass industry set up an English chapter in 1884 to watch the business in Europe; it remained small
 Toth, Gyorgy. "Knights across the Atlantic: The Knights of Labor in Britain and Ireland." (2019): 151–156.
  Watillon, Leon. and Frederic Meyers, The Knights of Labor in Belgium. Westport, CT: Greenwood Press, 1978. Also in partial translation by Frederic Meyers, Institute of Industrial Relations, Los Angeles, 1959: http://www.oac.cdlib.org/ark:/28722/bk0003t812j/?brand=oac4

Primary sources

By Knights
  
  
  
  
 
 
 
 William Baillie Baird papers, at the University of Maryland libraries. Baird was a commissioned organizer of the Knights of Labor.

By others
 A.C. Dunham, "The Knights of Labor," New Englander and Yale Review, vol. 45, no. 195 (June 1886), pp. 490–498.
 John Stephens Durham, "The Labor Unions and the Negro," Atlantic Monthly, vol. 81, no. 484 (February 1898), pp. 222–231.
 Henry George, "The New Party," North American Review, vol. 145, no. 368 (July 1887), pp. 1–8.
 Rufus Hatch, "The Labor Crisis," North American Review, vol. 142, no. 355 (June 1886), pp. 602–607.
 Richard J. Hinton, "American Labor Organizations," North American Review, vol. 140, no. 338 (January 1885), pp. 48–63.
 M.E.J. Kelley, "Women and the Labor Movement, North American Review, vol. 166, no. 497 (April 1898), pp. 408–418.
 George Frederic Parsons, "The Labor Question," Atlantic Monthly, vol. 58, no. 345 (July 1886), pp. 97–113.
 Carroll D. Wright, "An Historical Sketch of the Knights of Labor," Quarterly Journal of Economics, vol. 1, no. 2 (January 1887), pp. 137–168.

External links

 Record of proceedings of the General Assembly of the Knights of Labor 1878
 "Select Bibliography of Terence V. Powderly and the Knights of Labor," Catholic University of America. Retrieved October 8, 2006.
 

Knights of Labor
American cooperative organizers
Defunct trade unions in the United States
Defunct American political movements
Service organizations based in the United States
Trade unions in Canada
Trade unions in New Zealand
National trade union centers of the United States
Trade unions established in 1869
1869 establishments in the United States
Anti-Chinese sentiment in the United States
Anti-immigration politics in the United States